Fernando Salinas Manfredini (born 2 March 1956) is a Chilean activist who was elected as a member of the Chilean Constitutional Convention.

In 1989, he realized the documental El Despertar de la Conciencia.

On 2 September 2021, he resigned to The List of the People together with Francisca Arauna.

References

External links
 BCN Profile
 

Living people
1956 births
Chilean people
University of Chile alumni
21st-century Chilean politicians
Members of the List of the People
Members of the Chilean Constitutional Convention